The Bridgeport Barrage played their third season, as a charter member of the MLL, during the 2003 season of Major League Lacrosse.  The 2003 season was the team's last season in Bridgeport, Connecticut before relocating to the Philadelphia suburb of Villanova for the 2004 season.  The Barrage ended up in 3rd place in the American Division with a record of 1–11.  The Barrage failed to qualify for the 2003 season MLL playoffs.

Schedule

Major League Lacrosse seasons
Bridgeport Barrage
Bridgeport Barrage
Lacrosse in Connecticut